Piet Norval and Kevin Ullyett were the defending champions, but lost in the semifinals this year.

Mark Knowles and Daniel Nestor won the title, defeating Petr Pála and Pavel Vízner 6–3, 6–2 in the final.

Seeds

Draw

Draw

External links
Draw

2000 Stockholm Open
2000 ATP Tour